Trevor Graeme Burnard (born 15 October 1961) is professor of history at the University of Hull. He is a specialist in the history of slavery in the Atlantic world. He was formerly at the University of Warwick. and the University of Melbourne.

Selected publications
 The Plantation Machine: Atlantic Capitalism in French Saint-Domingue and British Jamaica
 Mastery, Tyranny, and Desire: Thomas Thistlewood and His Slaves in the Anglo-Jamaican World
 Creole Gentlemen: The Maryland Elite, 1691-1776
 The Idea of Atlantic History: Oxford Bibliographies Online Research Guide
 Colonization of English America: Oxford Bibliographies Online Research Guide
 British Atlantic World: Oxford Bibliographies Online Research Guide
 American Revolution: Oxford Bibliographies Online Research Guide
 Planters, Merchants, and Slaves

References

External links 

Academic staff of the University of Melbourne
Academics of the University of Warwick
Historians of the Caribbean
Historians of slavery
Academics of the University of Sussex
University of Otago alumni
Johns Hopkins University alumni
20th-century New Zealand historians
1961 births
Living people
21st-century New Zealand historians